Birmensdorf is a municipality in the district of Dietikon in the canton of Zürich in Switzerland.

History
Birmensdorf is first mentioned in 876 as Piripoumesdorf.

Geography

Of this area, 41% is used for agricultural purposes, while 38.3% is forested. Of the rest of the land, 20.2% is settled (buildings or roads) and the remainder (0.5%) is non-productive (rivers, glaciers or mountains).   housing and buildings made up 12.8% of the total area, while transportation infrastructure made up the rest (7.3%). Of the total unproductive area, water (streams and lakes) made up 0.4% of the area.   14.1% of the total municipal area was undergoing some type of construction.

The municipality is located in the Reppischtal.  It includes the hamlet of Landikon and numerous scattered farm houses.  The village of Birmensdorf includes the former hamlets of Wullikon, Schüren, Güpf, Uf Dorf and Risi.

The Wüeribach stream empties into the Reppisch near Birmensdorf.

Demographics
, 19.0% of the population was made up of foreign nationals.   the gender distribution of the population was 49.8% male and 50.2% female. Over the last 10 years the population has grown at a rate of 13.7%. Most of the population speaks German  (87.1%), with Italian being second most common ( 2.6%) and French being third ( 1.4%).

In the 2007 election the most popular party was the SVP which received 41% of the vote.  The next three most popular parties were the SPS (16%), the FDP (12.7%) and the CVP (9.5%).

The age distribution of the population is children and teenagers (0–19 years old) make up 19% of the population, while adults (20–64 years old) make up 67.6% and seniors (over 64 years old) make up 13.3%.  The entire Swiss population is generally well educated.  In Birmensdorf about 80.3% of the population (between age 25-64) have completed either non-mandatory upper secondary education or additional higher education (either university or a Fachhochschule).  There are 2508 households in Birmensdorf.

Birmensdorf has an unemployment rate of 2.38%.  , there were 78 people employed in the primary economic sector and about 27 businesses involved in this sector.  440 people are employed in the secondary sector and there are 66 businesses in this sector.  1270 people are employed in the tertiary sector, with 188 businesses in this sector.   43.6% of the working population were employed full-time, and 56.4% were employed part-time.

 there were 1738 Catholics and 2227 Protestants in Birmensdorf.  In the  religion was broken down into several smaller categories.  From the 2000 census, 46.5% were some type of Protestant, with 44.6% belonging to the Swiss Reformed Church and 1.9% belonging to other Protestant churches.  30.1% of the population were Catholic.  Of the rest of the population, 0% were Muslim, 5.2% belonged to another religion (not listed), 3.2% did not give a religion, and 14% were atheist or agnostic.

The historical population is given in the following table:

Transport 
Birmensdorf railway station is a stop of the Zürich S-Bahn on the lines S5 and S14. It is an 18 minute ride from Zürich Hauptbahnhof.

The municipality is located on the A3 motorway.

References

External links 

 Birmensdorf Online Official website 
 
 

Municipalities of the canton of Zürich